Montalbán is a town and municipality in Spain with a population of 1,538, an area of 82 km2 and a density of 18.75, located in Teruel province, in the autonomous community of Aragón. It is the historical and cultural capital of the Cuencas Mineras Aragonese comarca.

The Sierra de San Just rises south of the town. Road N-211 crosses the southern end of Montalbán.

References

External links

 Aerial view of Montalbán, Teruel, Spain. (Google maps)

Municipalities in the Province of Teruel